Štefan Svitek (January 23, 1960, Podbrezová, Banská Bystrica Region, Czechoslovakia  June 8, 1989, Bratislava, Czechoslovakia) was a Slovak murderer who killed his pregnant wife and two daughters in 1987. For this crime, Svitek was sentenced to death. He was the last person executed in Czechoslovakia. 

Vladimír Lulek was the last person executed in the Czech part of Czechoslovakia with his death on February 2, 1989.

See also 

 List of most recent executions by jurisdiction

General references 

Posledný odsúdený na smrť na území Československa
Štefan Svitek
Oprášené drámy: Beštia Štefan rozštvrtil ženu a dve dcéry!
Štefan Svitek rozsekal těhotnou manželku (†31) a dvě dcerky (†4 a †6), pak jim vytrhal vnitřnosti a ukájel se nad mrtvými těly!
Najväčšie kriminálne prípady Slovenska : Horehronský rozparovač Štefan Svitek
Stefan Svitek
Od poslední popravy v Česku uplynulo dvacet let

People executed for murder
1960 births
1989 deaths
Slovak people convicted of murder
Czechoslovak people convicted of murder
People convicted of murder by Czechoslovakia
People executed by the Czechoslovak Socialist Republic by hanging
Executed Czechoslovak people
Executed Slovak people
20th-century criminals
People from Banská Bystrica District
Familicides
Violence against women in Slovakia
Violence against women in Czechoslovakia